E. W. B. Curry founded Curry Normal and Industrial Institute at Urbana, Ohio, United States in 1889 for the training of African-American youths.  The institute included a Bible school and normal, literary, commercial, music, and industrial departments.  In 1913, the institute received a gift of $2000 from Martha Fouse, a former slave.  E. W. B. Curry served as the first president of the institute.  His service as president continued for more than twenty years.

Educational institutions established in 1889
Historically black schools
Education in Champaign County, Ohio
Vocational schools in Ohio
1889 establishments in Ohio